William F. Ballhaus Jr. (born January 28, 1945) is an American engineer.  From 2001 to 2007, he was president and chief executive officer of The Aerospace Corporation, an independent, nonprofit organization dedicated to the objective application of science and technology toward the solution of critical issues in the nation’s space program.

He previously worked for Lockheed Martin Corporation, Martin Marietta Corporation and was director of NASA's Ames Research Center.  He holds three engineering degrees from the University of California, Berkeley where he was a member of Phi Kappa Tau fraternity.

With his election into the NAE, he and his father, William F. Ballhaus Sr., became the first father-son members of NAE.

References

External links
National Academy of Engineering member page

1945 births
Living people
UC Berkeley College of Engineering alumni
American aerospace engineers
Members of the United States National Academy of Engineering
American nonprofit chief executives
Lockheed Martin people
Martin Marietta people